Rzepin railway station is a railway station serving the town of Rzepin, in the Lubusz Voivodeship, Poland. The station is located on the Warsaw–Kunowice railway, Wrocław–Szczecin railway and Wierzbno–Rzepin railway. The train services are operated by PKP and Polregio.

Train services
The station is served by the following service(s):

EuroCity services (EC) (EC 95 by DB) (EIC by PKP) Berlin - Frankfurt (Oder) - Rzepin - Poznan - Kutno - Warsaw
EuroCity services (EC) (EC 95 by DB) (IC by PKP) Berlin - Frankfurt (Oder) - Rzepin - Poznan - Bydgoszcz - Gdansk - Gdynia
EuroCity services (EC) (EC 95 by DB) (IC by PKP) Berlin - Frankfurt (Oder) - Rzepin - Wrocław – Katowice – Kraków – Rzeszów – Przemyśl
EuroNight services (EN) Paris - Strasbourg - Berlin - Frankfurt (Oder) - Poznan - Warsaw - Brest - Minsk - Moscow
Intercity services (IC) Swinoujscie - Szczecin - Kostrzyn - Rzepin - Zielona Gora - Wroclaw - Katowice - Kraków
Intercity services (TLK) Lublin Główny — Świnoujście
Regional services (R) Rzepin - Swiebodzin - Zbasynek
Regional services (R) Zielona Gora - Rzepin - Frankfurt (Oder)/Kostrzyn

References 

 This article is based upon a translation of the Polish language version as of July 2016.

Railway stations in Lubusz Voivodeship
Człuchów County
Railway stations in Poland opened in 1870